Hardcore wrestling is a form of professional wrestling where disqualifications, count-outs, and all other different rules do not apply. Taking place in usual or unusual environments, hardcore wrestling matches allow the use of numerous items, including ladders, tables, chairs, thumbtacks, barbed wire, light tubes, shovels, baseball bats (sometimes wrapped in barbed wire), golf clubs, hammers, axe handles, chains, crowbars, wrenches, tongs, and other improvised weapons used as foreign objects. Although hardcore wrestling is a staple of most wrestling promotions, where they are often used at the climaxes of feuds, some promotions (such as Big Japan Pro Wrestling, International Wrestling Syndicate, IWA-MS, Game Changer Wrestling, Combat Zone Wrestling) specialize in hardcore wrestling, with many matches performed in this manner.

Hardcore wrestling was first acknowledged as a major wrestling style in Japan with promotions such as Frontier Martial-Arts Wrestling and W*ING. It then became successful in America with Extreme Championship Wrestling. The World Wrestling Federation/Entertainment capitalized on the success and introduced the WWF Hardcore Championship in the 1990s. The WWF soon began to turn the matches into comedy skits, illustrating the ridiculousness they involved. Hardcore contrasts with traditional mat-based wrestling, where solid technical skills are preferred over hardcore's stuntworks, blood, sweat, gore, and severe shock value.

History

Early history

As professional wrestling entered the mid 20th century, promoters and performers looked for ways to heighten audience excitement. Blood, while initially taboo, was found to be a significant draw, and the advent of the now-cliché "no holds barred" match marked the beginning of what is now known as hardcore wrestling. Methods were devised for wrestlers to make themselves bleed purposefully as part of their performance. During the 1950s and '60s wrestlers such as "Wild Bull" Curry, "Classy" Freddie Blassie, Dory Funk, Sr. and Giant Baba were among those who introduced the bloody brawling style which caught on in Japan and the American South. New match types were devised that resembled street fighting, such as matches which were held in a cage, Texas Deathmatches which incorporated weapons, and Lights Out matches which were 'unsanctioned' and took place after the rest of the scheduled card, once the house lights had briefly been turned off to signify the end of the event. The National Wrestling Alliance had Brass knuckles championships in the Texas and Florida territories, dating from the 1950s. (The Texas title was taken by World Class Championship Wrestling when it split away).

Brawling continued to evolve and grow in popularity in America through the 1960s, 1970s and 1980s. The Detroit territory was home to The Sheik, Abdullah the Butcher and Bobo Brazil, and featured long, bloody brawls. The Puerto Rico territory featured Carlos Colón, The Invader and Abdullah, and introduced fire as an element of violence. The Memphis territory featured Jerry Lawler, Terry Funk, Eddie Gilbert and Bill Dundee and introduced the empty arena match and fighting among the crowd into the concession stands, improvising attacks with whatever appliances could be found. More specialties such as ladder matches, scaffold matches and Dog Collar matches were introduced. The NWA eventually instituted a World Brass Knuckles Championship, which was active in the Tennessee territory from 1978 to 1980.

1990s

In 1989, Frontier Martial-Arts Wrestling (FMW) was founded in Japan, the first promotion dedicated largely to the wild brawling style. In the early 1990s, the Puerto Rican promoter Víctor Quiñones arrived in Japan, being invited to FMW as the special manager. FMW escalated the violence to legitimately dangerous new levels, with barbed wire ropes, timed C4 explosives, exploding wire ropes, and "land mines", known as "deathmatch". The federation featured many future North American stars, and became very popular worldwide.

Soon after, in the United States, two independent promotions had brief but significant runs, serving as prototypes for Extreme Championship Wrestling. The Philadelphia-based Tri-State Wrestling Alliance held occasional supercards that featured big name stars among their own local talent, and showcased wild bloody main event brawls with Abdullah the Butcher, The Sheik, Jesse James Sr. and others. The National Wrestling Federation (formerly known as Continental Wrestling Alliance) was based in New York state. Both TWA and NWF featured Larry Winters and D. C. Drake, who engaged in a long blood feud.
The two promotions ended about the same time, and National Wrestling Alliance Eastern Championship Wrestling took their place, with many of the same wrestlers and venues. Eddie Gilbert was the initial booker, and was replaced a few months later by Paul Heyman. After splitting off from the NWA, the company changed its name to Extreme Championship Wrestling, and became the leading independent hardcore wrestling federation in North America. ECW coined the term "hardcore wrestling", but its usage there was slightly different than it is used today. In ECW, 'hardcore' referred to a strong work ethic, high levels of effort, dedication to the fans, and lack of fluff or filler. Their level of violence rarely equaled that of the Japanese promotions.

A new gimmick, breaking wooden tables, was introduced to ECW through Sabu, nephew of The Sheik. Sabu had developed a gimmick of throwing himself through a propped-up table in Japan in order to entertain the crowd and get his character over as a wild and possibly insane man. He then started to put opponents through tables, a relatively safe spot which looked and sounded devastating. He brought it with him to ECW, where it became the focus of a feud involving multiple teams. The table spot became a staple of ECW events, and has become so commonplace that it is now incorporated into otherwise non-hardcore matches in almost every promotion.

In Japan, hardcore promotions sprang up around the country, including Wrestling International New Generations W*ING, the International Wrestling Association of Japan and Big Japan Pro Wrestling. New elements included fluorescent light tubes, scattered thumb tacks, flaming ropes and live piranhas.

In the mid-1990s, FMW eventually held female hardcore matches at the suggestion of Megumi Kudo. The first one was held between Megumi Kudo and Combat Toyoda as a deathmatch where the ring ropes were replaced with electrified barbed-wire with explosives. After the match, many female wrestlers had various brutal and bloody deathmatches in FMW with barbed-wire ropes, barbed-wire barricades, exploding barbed-wire barricades, electrified/exploding barbed-wire ropes, broken glass, or mixtures of any and all these. These matches often included various dangerous weapons such as barbed-wire wrapped chains, flaming barbed-wire baseball bats, and sickles. Most of the wrestlers who competed in these deathmatches, including some non-FMW rosters such as Shinobu Kandori, Lioness Asuka, and Mayumi Ozaki, were sent to the hospital afterwards.

ECW's popularity led to the major American promotions of the 90s, World Championship Wrestling and World Wrestling Federation, creating divisions devoted exclusively to "hardcore" wrestling (which mostly amounted to no-disqualification weapons matches). The divisions were at first largely centered around ECW alumni such as Mick Foley, Terry Funk, Raven and Sandman. In the World Wrestling Federation/Entertainment, ladder matches, which had become more common, were now combined with tables and weapons matches to create Tables, Ladders, and Chairs matches.

2000s
ECW influenced wrestling organizations such as Xtreme Pro Wrestling, International Wrestling Syndicate, IWA Mid-South, Combat Zone Wrestling, and Juggalo Championship Wrestling, which carried on ECW's violent style after it went defunct.

Hardcore wrestling has fallen out of favor in the major American promotions; the last major hardcore title was the WWE Hardcore Championship, which merged into the Intercontinental Title in 2002. However, WWE still features a yearly pay per view event based around hardcore wrestling called WWE Extreme Rules. In 2006, the MTV-affiliated promotion/show Wrestling Society X featured hardcore wrestling, but was cancelled after one season.

Rules
The main rule behind hardcore can have various connotations. Thus, hardcore wrestling is often separated into distinct "levels" based on the graphic nature of the match:
A 24/7 title match describes a situation where a hardcore wrestler must defend the title at all times and all places. The match (and the title) can be won by pinfall (or submission) at any time and in any place in the presence of a referee. The match has no fixed location, timeframe or even opponent (in certain cases even non-human animals or inanimate objects can become champions). This is one of the most severe forms of hardcore match given its unpredictability. This was initially a self-imposed stipulation of Crash Holly's WWE Hardcore Championship but afterward became a general rule of the title. During the time Holly defended his title, he did so in such locations as his hotel room, at the airport, in a supermarket, and even at an arcade.
A no disqualification match, a no holds barred match, or an anything goes match tends to be less severe, with action taking place mostly inside the ring, despite most of the time there is a no countout stipulation. Usage of foreign objects is typically low and minimal, with run-ins (another form of disqualification) being frequently used. The match is often contested between valets (where they may lack wrestling skills), or between a wrestler and a valet (in which a wrestler is expected to run-in and defend their valets). Because of the low-key nature, few consider a no-disqualification match as hardcore, although there is no semantic difference.
A street fight uses the various elements of "No Holds Barred" and "No Disqualification" and occasionally does allow pinfalls and submissions outside of the ring. The only real difference/variation is that in a street fight, wrestlers wear their street clothes instead of tights, although there have been street fights where the combatants wear their tights. Also, like an "I Quit" match, rope break does not apply, so having any part of the body against the ropes will not break a submission or pin attempt. The only way to get out of a submission is to fight off the submission attempt. But the person applying the hold can use the ropes, or even weapons, for extra leverage.
A deathmatch tends to be bloody, brutal, and the most severe, with a heavy emphasis on the use of heavy bleeding and the usage of fluorescent light tubes, light bulbs, panes of glass, barbed wire (sometimes electrified when tied around the ring), fire, thumbtacks, razor blades, gusset plates, syringes, explosives, bed of nails, bed of barbed wire, staple guns, concrete blocks, live piranhas, cactus plants, live scorpions and other dangerous wrestling weapons, along with graphic violence, to induce extreme and heavy bleeding and will typically led to bloodier, more brutal and more violent contests. The types and nature of foreign objects are meant be extremely graphic, brutal, dangerous, bloody and violent. In more recent years, some state athletic commissions in the US have cracked down on the types and frequency of weapons used in these matches.
A hardcore match, sometimes referred to as a Raven's Rules match or an Extreme Rules match, tends to be somewhere in between, and that emphasize the blood, brutality, and real violence, instead emphasis on the brutality of the attacks, moderate brawling techniques, the use of foreign objects and other obstacles of various sorts such as chairs, chains, tables, kendo sticks, fireballs, ladders, and tire irons, and the extreme physical toll on the wrestlers involved, but also often combined with brawling all over the arena or anywhere rather than traditional wrestling holds and techniques. WWE dubs the Hardcore match as an "Extreme Rules" match, and "Belfast Brawl" when the match features Finlay. While less graphic, the "rules" are the same in a hardcore match as in a deathmatch; that is, there are no rules beyond a 3-count pin for victory and/or a submission victory. Another variations of hardcore match such as "Extreme match"; the version of hardcore match that heavily featured highspots and weapon attacks, and the "HardKore X-Treme match"; the match was same as hardcore match except weapons include flaming tables, flaming chairs, flaming weapons, razor wire, glass boards, and weapons wrapped in barbed wire. CZW dubs the Hardcore matches as "Ultraviolent Rules" match, the hardcore-style matches that will involve, encourage, and emphasize the spirits of Combat Zone Wrestling, along with ladders, tables, chairs, thumbtacks, nails, barbed wire, light tubes, glass, fire, weed whacker, staple guns, as well as all other various weapons covered in anything else (barbwired steel chairs, nail bats, barbed wired bats, light tube bats, barbwired tables, flaming tables, light tube tables, barbed wired ladders, barbed wired glass sheets, light tube glass sheet, beds of barbed wire, beds of light tubes, beds of thumbtacks, etc.). JCW also dubs the hardcore match called "Juggalo Rulz" matches or JCW Deathmatch are Hardcore-style matches that will emphasize the spirits of Juggalo Championship Wrestling.
Combat Zone Wrestling's Cage of Death, which is held yearly, implements the use of multiple weapons littered around the wrestling ring and attached to the cage walls. The usual weapons are there, as are unusual ones, such as weedwhackers.

A staple gun match may take (and has taken) many different forms. Just about any singles, triple threats, four-ways, or melee match type can be adapted to staple gun matches but the common thread in each one is that wrestlers try and staple something to their opponent. The occurrence of this event is more common on the independent wrestling circuits like the IWA Mid-South King of the Deathmatch or Hardcore wrestling circuits staple matches are commonplace. Rules vary for each tournament or wrestlers association but the underlining concept is stapling something to the body of the other wrestler.  In Outcast Xtreme Wrestling (OXW) events the first person to staple seven one-dollar bills to their opponent wins.  In the Combat Zone Wrestling league the number of bills is 13, they call their staple gun matches the, "Unlucky 13 Staple Gun".   International Wrestling Association (IWA) has their own version called the "Unlucky Seven Staple Gun Match." The popular midget wrestling league run by Puppet the Psycho Dwarf and his merry band of Half-Pint Brawlers' main event is called the, "$21 Staple Gun Match".  In this version each dwarf is armed with a stapler and as the match goes on audience members throw bills into the ring.  The first person to staple 11 bills to the other wrestler body wins.   When asked about the event Puppet said "Getting a dollar bill stapled to your tongue leaves a bad taste in your mouth." A staple gun match was showcased in the 2008 film The Wrestler, between main character Randy "The Ram" Robinson, and real-life hardcore wrestler Necro Butcher.

Common weapons

Hardcore matches tend to emphasize the use of certain weapons, the brutality of the attacks, moderate brawling techniques, and the extreme physical toll on the wrestlers, and thus many euphemisms for these matches are employed. The almost kayfabe-breaking accessibility of some of these weapons—often under the ring—to wrestlers has led to the noun "plunder" in reference to them. For example, Street Fights and Bunkhouse Brawls are hardcore-style matches which emphasize that wrestlers need not be in typical wrestling gear when they are battling, while the No Holds Barred match emphasizes the no-disqualification rule, the "HardKore X-Treme matches are the version of hardcore rules match except weapons include flaming tables, flaming chairs, flaming weapons, razor wire, sheets of glass, and weapons that are covered in barbed wire, and Deathmatches that emphasize fluorescent light tubes, panes of glass, barbed wire, fire, thumbtacks, razor blades, gusset plates, syringes, needles, explosives, bed of nails, staple guns, concrete blocks, alive piranhas and all other foreign objects to provoke extreme and heavy bleeding. In WWE, Extreme Rules matches are hardcore-style matches that emphasize the spirit of its former competitor, Extreme Championship Wrestling. In CZW dubs the Hardcore match as "Ultraviolent Rules" match, the hardcore-style matches that could involve and emphasize ladders, tables, chairs, thumbtacks, barbed wire, light tubes, glass boards, fire, staple guns, and the spirits of Combat Zone Wrestling. In JCW, "Juggalo Rules" match, the Hardcore-style matches that emphasize the spirit of Juggalo Championship Wrestling. Other euphemisms, such as the Good Housekeeping match and Full Metal Mayhem, emphasize the use of certain foreign objects as being legal (the former with kitchen implements and the latter with metallic objects). In a Fans Bring the Weapons match, wrestlers fight with "weapons" that members of the audience bring to the venue (most often brought are standard kitchen household appliances, like frying pans, toasters, or rolling pins, although its not unusual that fans occasionally bring in items that are far more improbable, like an artificial leg or LEGO); this was popularized in the United States by ECW and is now a speciality in Combat Zone Wrestling (CZW). Below is a list of some common weapons.

Blunt objects
Broomstick: A very common weapon in professional wrestling. Most often found in trashcans.
Steel chair: Another very common weapon in professional wrestling. The chair sees many different uses, and is most often retrieved from either beneath the ring or from the timekeeper's area.

Kendo stick: Also inaccurately known as a "Singapore cane", the kendo stick is another very common weapon, as it was one of the first weapons that saw use in a hardcore match, and its association with ECW legend The Sandman.
Table: The table has become a staple of hardcore wrestling, and instances of wrestlers being put through tables covered in thumbtacks, barbed wire, glass, light tubes, light bulbs, lit on fire or multiple tables with sometimes combinations of the aforementioned are common.
Ladder: A ladder's use is usually limited to ladder-based matches, but may see occasional use in other hardcore matches.
Brass knuckles: Sometimes abbreviated to brass knucks or just knucks. Brass knuckles, while seen as a cheap shot in traditional professional wrestling, these are a common weapon in hardcore wrestling.
Trashcan: Another common weapon choice in hardcore wrestling is the aluminum trashcan. The trashcan is usually either used as a melee weapon or in a table-like manner. It may sometimes be filled with light tubes or other objects, and a wrestler is then tossed into the can. The lids of the trashcans are also common weapons, as they function similar to the cookie sheet (see below).
Bowling Ball: A bowling ball may be pulled out of a bag when an opponent is sitting at a turnbuckle, and thrown into their groin. This was popularized by Al Snow.
Fire: Flaming weapons, flaming chairs, and flaming tables, along with fireballs and fire, are common in hardcore wrestling.
Cookie Sheet: A classic hardcore weapon from the '90s, makes a loud sound when used to strike the head.
2x4: The 2x4 is a length of wood that sees some notable use in hardcore wrestling, usually either wrapped in barbed wire or wrapped in razor wire, wrapped in light tubes, or set on fire.
Fire extinguisher: The fire extinguisher may be used either to spray an opponent or as a melee weapon, or both.
Pipe: Most commonly steel or iron, occasionally lead. Pipes are common in hardcore wrestling, though not as common as some other weapons.
Cinderblocks: Usually used in a fashion similar to tables, sometimes used as a weapon by itself.

Sharp objects

Sharp objects are not as common as blunt objects in hardcore wrestling, and are often featured in only the bloodiest and most violent wrestling matches.
Glass pane: Sheets of glass are common in hardcore wrestling. When a wrestler is slammed through it, the glass is usually removed from the ring to prevent bloody and deadly injuries.
Razor wire: Usually not referred to as barbed wire, these metal wires with sharp edges or studded with small sharpened blades may line and wrapped around the steel cages or be wrapped around weapons.
Light tubes: Common in CZW, JCW and XPW, fluorescent lamp tubes made of glass are often busted over a wrestler. Light tubes may be stacked up and used in a similar fashion to a table.
Thumbtacks: Thumbtacks are another staple of hardcore wrestling. They are most often dumped onto the ring mat and a wrestler is slammed into them. Thumbtacks were popularized in WWE by Mick Foley.
Barbed wire: The metal wires with clusters of small sharp spikes will see widespread use in hardcore (and deathmatch) wrestling, from simply covering all weapons to being used, as well as a replacement for traditional ring ropes to being used as a web covering the ring. An object wrapped in barbed wire will often be referred to as a "barbed wire baseball bat" or a "barbed wire chair". Beds of barbed wire are also common.
Kenzan: A small, spiky object common in BJW. The metal spikes will often stick in a wrestler's flesh.
Staple gun: In recent years staple guns have become common in hardcore matches. The staples can be used to stick objects into wrestlers' skin and can draw small amounts of blood without having to resort to blading.

Hardcore championships
In promotions where Hardcore wrestling is present, a Hardcore title may come into existence. This form of title is defended under hardcore rules, and title changes are frequent. Some hardcore titles may have their own unique rules. For example, the WWE Hardcore Championship was defended under 24/7 rules, meaning it could be defended and won at any time, provided a referee was present to make the pinfall. The OVW Hardcore Championship had a trashcan passed from wrestler to wrestler rather than a belt. The GHC Openweight Hardcore Championship had a unique stipulation in that if a challenger who is outweighed by the champion survives 15 minutes, he won the match and the title. A new title, the WWE 24/7 Championship was created by WWE with the same concept as the WWE Hardcore Championship in 2019.

See also
 Styles of wrestling

References

 Combat Zone Wrestling
Professional wrestling genres
Extreme Championship Wrestling
Professional wrestling styles